Lieuran may refer to two communes in the Hérault department in southern France:
 Lieuran-Cabrières
 Lieuran-lès-Béziers